The men's water polo tournament at the 2009 World Aquatics Championships, organised by the FINA, was held in Rome, Italy from 20 July to 1 August 2009. All matches were held in a temporary pool at the tennis stadium of the Foro Italico sports complex.

The men's tournament was won by Serbia.

Teams

Groups formed

Group A
 
 
 
 

Group B
 
 
 
 

Group C
 
 
 
 

Group D

Preliminary round
All times are Central European Summer Time (UTC+2)

Tie-breaking criteria
If two teams shall have equal points, further classification shall be established as follows:
 The team winning the game between them shall be placed higher.
 If the game between them was tied, then the results against the highest placed team(s) in the group shall be considered.
 The first comparison shall be based on goal difference, and if still tied, then based on goals scored.
 The comparison shall be made first compared to the highest placed team (or teams, if tied) in the group.
 If still tied, the results against the next highest placed team (or teams, if tied) shall be used in succession until all results have been considered.
 If still tied, the teams shall shoot penalty shots to determine which team shall be placed higher.  Each team shall nominate five players and a goalkeeper who will participate in the penalty shoot out. The team shall shoot five penalty shots at the goal of the other team, alternating shots.  If a tie exists after each team has taken five shots, then teams shall take sets of alternate shots until one team scores and the other does not. The procedure shall be conducted following the final game of the round or at the first practical opportunity.
If there is more than one tie in a group, the highest placed tie shall be determined first.

If three or more teams shall have equal points, further classification shall be established as follows:
 The results among the tied teams shall determine which team is placed highest.
 If, at any time during the application of the procedure set out in this paragraph, the highest placed team is determined and the number of tied teams is reduced to two, then the above paragraph shall be used to determine which of the two remaining teams is placed higher.
 The comparison shall be made first, upon the points of the games among the tied teams, second, the goal difference, and third, based upon goals scored.
 If still tied, the games played against the highest placed team (or teams, if tied) shall be considered.
 The first comparison shall be based on goal difference, and if still tied, then based on goals scored.
 If still tied, the results against the next highest placed team (or teams, if tied) shall be used in succession until all results have been considered.
 If still tied, the teams shall shoot penalty shots to determine which team shall be placed highest. Each team shall nominate five players and a goalkeeper who will participate in the penalty shoot out. Each team shall shoot five  penalty shots at its opponent's goal in alternate succession. The first team shall take its first penalty shot and then each other team shall take its first penalty shot, etc.  If a tie shall exist after that procedure, the teams shall then take sets of alternate shots until one team misses and the other(s) score. The procedure shall be conducted following the final game of the round or at the first practical opportunity.
If there is more than one tie in a group, the highest placed tie shall be determined first.

Source:

Group A

Group B

Group C

Group D

Final round

Brackets

 5th–8th place

 9th–12th place

13th–16th place

Semifinals 13–16 places

Eightfinals

15th place

13th place

Semifinals 9–12 places

Quarterfinals

11th place

9th place

Semifinals 5–8 places

Semifinals

7th place

5th place

Bronze medal match

Gold medal match

Final ranking

Medalists

Individual awards
 Most Valuable Player

 Best Goalkeeper

 Topscorer
 — 20 goals (2 in penalty shootout)

References

External links
 13th FINA World Championships 2009 FINA Water Polo website
 Water Polo Men – Competition schedule web.archive.org
Records and statistics (reports by Omega)
 Men Water Polo World Championship 2009 Roma www.todor66.com

2009
Mens

fr:Water-polo aux Championnats du monde de natation 2009